Hadi Hejazifar (Persian: هادی حجازی‌فر; born June 21, 1976) is an Iranian actor, director and screenwriter. He gained attention and received critical acclaim for his performances in films Standing in the Dust (2016), Midday Adventures (2017), Lottery (2018) and Majority (2021). He has received various accolades, including a Crystal Simorgh, a Hafez Award, an Urban International Film Festival Award and two Iran's Film Critics and Writers Association Awards.

Filmography

Film

Web

Television

Awards and nominations

References

External links 

 

Iranian male film actors
People from Khoy
Living people
All articles with unsourced statements
1976 births
Iranian screenwriters
Iranian film directors